The 2011 Dubai Sevens was the 11th edition of the tournament and was part of the 2011–12 IRB Sevens World Series. It was held at Dubai, United Arab Emirates, the host stadium was The Sevens stadium.

It was the official debut for the United Arab Emirates national team, the first of several national teams to have been created after the disbanding of the tournament's former host union, the Arabian Gulf Rugby Football Union.

England defended their title by defeating France 29–12 in the final.

Also, it included the first official IRB-sponsored women's sevens event outside of the Rugby World Cup Sevens. Eight national teams competed in the IRB Women's Sevens Challenge Cup — Australia, Brazil, Canada, China, England, South Africa, Spain, and the USA, with the semi-finals and finals played on the main pitch at The Sevens.

Canada won the inaugural event by defeating England in the final 26–7.

Format
The teams were divided into pools of four teams, who played a round-robin within the pool. Points were awarded in each pool on a different schedule from most rugby tournaments—3 for a win, 2 for a draw, 1 for a loss.
The top two teams in each pool advanced to the Cup competition. The four quarterfinal losers dropped into the bracket for the Plate. The Bowl was contested by the third- and fourth-place finishers in each pool, with the losers in the Bowl quarterfinals dropping into the bracket for the Shield.

Teams
The participating teams were:

Pool stage
The draw was made on November 26.

All times are local (UTC+4).

Pool A

Pool B

Pool C

Pool D

Knockout stage

Shield

Bowl

Plate

Cup

References

External links

2010
2011–12 IRB Sevens World Series
2011 in Emirati sport
2011 in Asian rugby union